El Araba El Madfuna ( al-ʿarabah al-madfūnah, meaning 'the Buried Waggon', also known as Arabet Abydos) is a town in Egypt. It is located south of Sohag.

Overview
Tourists often visit the site to see the ruins of the temples of Seti I and Ramesses II, although a large number of other ruins and monuments are also located nearby, ranging from Pre-Dynastic through early Christian to Islamic and modern times.

References

Populated places in Sohag Governorate